Chy or CHY may refer to:
 Chy Davidson (born 1959), American football player
 Chysis, a genus of orchids abbreviated Chy
 Cheyenne language, by ISO 639 code CHY
 Chertsey railway station, with station code CHY
 Choiseul Bay Airport, in the Solomon Islands by IATA code
 CHY FM, a youth-run community radio station in Coffs Harbour, New South Wales, Australia